"Cry" is a song released by the English music duo Godley & Creme on 11 March 1985. It was included on the duo's album The History Mix Volume 1.

The song reached number 16 on the Billboard Hot 100 chart, becoming Godley & Creme's lone Top 40 hit in the US apart from their former band, 10cc. It reached No. 19 on the UK Singles Chart. The duo also directed the song's music video, which featured faces blended into each other using dissolving and wiping effects.

Creation and recording

After Godley & Creme left their former band 10cc after the group's fourth album, they began writing songs for an album, but became better known for producing music videos for other bands. Within the music video producing process, they met producer Trevor Horn, ex of the Buggles and now heading his own label ZTT Records.

Godley & Creme asked Horn to produce their album, but had very little material that was recording studio ready. After their first track failed to produce the required effect, Horn asked what else they had? The pair had already written the first verse of "Cry", and much as though the song came from a position - a man in a relationship where his partner lies and cheats on him - unlike 10cc's "I'm Not in Love", it didn't come from real-life experience. The three hence sat down and started writing down words and phrases which could be associated with the first verse, and then Horn put Godley in the recording booth to record them. Godley later described the song's creation process as "patchwork like", but it worked due to its envisaged simple production.

The basic sound of the track was provided by electronic music specialist J. J. Jeczalik who used a Clavia synthesizer. Godley & Creme then created the full backing track, which was mixed and produced by Horn.

Track listing
7" - Polydor (UK) 881 786-7
 "Cry" – 3:55
 "Love Bombs" – 3:54

12" - Polydor (UK) 881 786-1
 "Cry (Extended Version)" – 6:30
 "Love Bombs" – 4:52

12" - Polydor (US) 881 786-1
 "Cry (Extended Remix)" – 7:25
 "Cry (Single Version)" – 3:55
 "Cry (Extended Version)" – 6:30

12" - Polydor (CA) POLSXC 107
1 "Cry (Remix 12' Club Version)"
2 "Cry (Extended Version)"
2 "Love Bombs"

CDV - Polydor (UK) 080 010-2
 "Cry (Extended Version)" – 6:30
 "Love Bombs" – 4:53
 "Under Your Thumb" – 3:45
 "Power Behind The Throne" – 3:31
 "Cry" (Video) – 3:36

Chart positions

Weekly charts

Year-end charts

The Philosopher Kings version

Canadian band The Philosopher Kings covered the song for their 1997 album, Famous, Rich and Beautiful. It was released in May 1998 as the third single from the album and peaked at No. 10 on Canada's RPM Top Singles chart, ranking in at No. 38 on the magazine's year-end edition.

Charts

Other versions
In 1992, Australian musician Lisa Edwards covered the song and released it as a single. It reached No. 5 on the Australian ARIA Singles Chart, earned a Gold record from the Australian Recording Industry Association, and was the country's 41st-best-selling hit of the year.

References

1985 songs
1985 singles
Godley & Creme songs
Song recordings produced by Trevor Horn
Music videos directed by Godley and Creme
Black-and-white music videos
Songs written by Kevin Godley
Songs written by Lol Creme
Polydor Records singles